Flatfoot is a 2003 comedic play by David Williamson about the Roman playwright Plautus. It is one of Williamson's few plays not to be set in contemporary Australia and was written as a vehicle for actor Drew Forsythe. It features Plautus' play The Swaggering Soldier. Williamson:
I felt strongly about Plautus. He was a highly popular playwright. But he was going through the same agonies as any playwright so I identified with him – trying to convince the producer to put his next play on, trying to get his actors in line, trying to cast it, trying to keep them in order, trying to sort out his marital problems at the same time. He was a hugely funny character and I really liked him.

References

External links
Review of 2004 Sydney production at Sydney Morning Herald

Plays by David Williamson
2003 plays